The Johnson County Courthouse in Iowa City, Iowa, the county seat of Johnson County, was completed in 1901; it was the second courthouse to stand at this location. The building was listed on the National Register of Historic Places in 1975.

History

Johnson County's first courthouse was a two-story frame structure built in 1838 in Napoleon. A jail was built at the same time. The first courthouse built on the present courthouse square was built about 1856, but the records are unclear as to its specifications. In 1875 a suggestion was made that the courthouse should be donated to the University of Iowa, and the city and county would build a joint facility. The measure was to be put to the voters, but it never appeared on a ballot. By 1897 cracks were detected on the south wall, endangering the structure and the records it housed. Construction on the present courthouse began in 1899. The building was completed in 1901 for approximately $111,000. Its slate roof was damaged in a 2006 tornado.

Architecture
A. William Rush of the Grand Rapids, Michigan architectural firm of Rush, Bowman and Rush designed the building. The courthouse was built on a square south of the central business district with a commanding view of the surrounding area. It is notable for its fine Berea sandstone exterior carvings and interior stained glass domes. Stylistically, it features characteristics of three architectural trends from the era it was built: the arched openings and massiveness of the Richardsonian Romanesque; the vegetal ornamentation of Louis Sullivan above the main entrance; and the voluminous geometric massing of the Shingle Style. The central tower rises out of the rectangular-plan building. The irregular roofline is composed of conical roofs, turrets and the step gables of the end pavilions.

See also
List of Iowa county courthouses

References

External links

Government buildings completed in 1901
County courthouses in Iowa
Towers in Iowa
Buildings and structures in Iowa City, Iowa
Courthouses on the National Register of Historic Places in Iowa
National Register of Historic Places in Iowa City, Iowa
Richardsonian Romanesque architecture in Iowa
Shingle Style architecture in Iowa
1901 establishments in Iowa